Norine is a given name. Notable people with the name include:

Norine Burgess, Canadian singer
Norine Hammond, American politician
Norine G. Johnson (1935–2011), American psychologist 
Norine Kasperik, American politician

See also
Noreen (given name)